Sayxun is an urban-type settlement in Sirdaryo Region, Uzbekistan. It is the administrative center of Sayxunobod District. The town population in 1989 was 4877 people.

References

 

Populated places in Sirdaryo Region
Urban-type settlements in Uzbekistan